Manoubi Haddad (born 23 August 1996) is a French professional footballer who plays as an attacking midfielder for  club Paris 13 Atletico.

Career
Haddad started his career with Le Havre, making one appearance for their B side in the Championnat National 3 in May 2014. After a spell at Amiens, Haddad joined Tunisian Ligue Professionnelle 1 side Olympique Béja, making his professional debut in September 2016 in a 2–0 loss to ES Tunis. In January 2017, he joined Club Africain on a four-and-a-half year deal. In January 2020, Haddad left Club Africain and went on trial with Dundee United the following month. On 28 July 2020, Haddad signed for Championnat National side Quevilly-Rouen.

Personal life
Born in France, Haddad is of Tunisian descent.

References

External links

Living people
1996 births
Association football midfielders
French footballers
French sportspeople of Tunisian descent
Le Havre AC players
Olympique Béja players
Club Africain players
US Quevilly-Rouen Métropole players
Paris 13 Atletico players
Ligue 2 players
Championnat National players
Championnat National 3 players
Tunisian Ligue Professionnelle 1 players
Tunisian footballers